is a 1972 Japanese gangster film directed by Kazuhiko Yamaguchi, and co-written with Isao Matsumoto. The movie stars Meiko Kaji and Tsunehiko Watase. The movie was followed with a 1972 sequel entitled Gincho Nagaremono: Mesuneko Bakuchi.

Plot
Nami, a Bōsōzoku leader, kills a high-ranking member of a yakuza organization, due to a turf war and is sent to prison. After serving three years, she finds a home living with her uncle at a pool hall. After meeting a pimp named Ryuji, she acquires a job as a hostess in Ginza, where she soon becomes very popular. However, her criminal past is not easily left behind. Further complicating matters is a local yakuza named Owada, who attempts to take control of the bar and kills Ryuji's sworn brother. Defending her uncle's business and seeking revenge, Nami goes after Owada.

Cast
 Meiko Kaji as Higuchi Nami
 Tsunehiko Watase as Higashi Ryuji
 Akiko Koyama as Kayo
 Yayoi Watanabe as Hiroko
 Koji Nanbara as Owada
 Toru Yuri as Yousan
 Hiroshi Itsuki as Himself
 Tatsuo Umemiya as Matsudaira Shinnosuke

References

External links

1972 films
Films directed by Kazuhiko Yamaguchi
1970s Japanese-language films
1970s crime thriller films
Toei Company films
Cue sports films
1970s Japanese films